Warning: Her Majesty's Government Can Seriously Damage Your Health is the sixth EP by hardcore punk band Discharge, released in 1983 by Clay Records.

Track listing 
 "Warning"
 "Where There Is a Will There Is a Way"
 "In Defense of Our Future"
 "Anger Burning"

References

External links 
 

Discharge (band) EPs
1983 EPs
Albums produced by Mike "Clay" Stone